Direxiv was a motorsports company that competed in Super GT and Formula Nippon. The company had links to the GP2 Series, then the feeder series for Formula One, and had submitted an entry to run a Formula 1 team in 2008.

The team sponsored McLaren in F1 as well as former McLaren and former WilliamsF1 driver Alexander Wurz. Direxiv were linked with creating a "McLaren B-team" which would have given the then-GP2 competitor Lewis Hamilton (who was instead promoted directly to McLaren itself) and possibly either Pedro de la Rosa or Gary Paffett a seat in F1. Former F1 driver Jean Alesi was working with Direxiv and could have taken the role of team principal. Their entry to F1 faced competition from other companies as Carlin Motorsport, Eddie Jordan, Paul Stoddart and former GP2 team Racing Engineering. However, Direxiv lost the chance to gain entry to the 2008 season when the FIA chose to give the 12 entries to the 11 current teams and the final place to David Richards' Prodrive (who ultimately pulled out).

In August 2006, Direxiv announced that they would pull out of the Super GT due to the loss of their primary backer, Akiyama Holdings. The Suzuka 1000km was their last race in the series.

GP2 sponsorships
Direxiv had their logo on several cars in the 2006 GP2 field, including: 
DPR Direxiv (Direxiv title sponsors)
ART Grand Prix
BCN Competicion

British Formula 3 partnerships
Direxiv partnered competitors for the 2008 F1 grid spot, Carlin Motorsport, in the British F3 International Series and is the title sponsor for German driver Maro Engel.

External links 
Direxiv Motorsport

Japanese auto racing teams
Super GT teams
Formula Nippon teams
2005 establishments in Japan
Auto racing teams established in 2005